Great Britain, represented by the British Olympic Association (BOA), competed at the 1968 Summer Olympics in Mexico City, Mexico. 225 competitors, 175 men and 50 women, took part in 133 events in 16 sports. British athletes have competed in every Summer Olympic Games.

Medallists

Gold
David Hemery — Athletics, Men's 400m Hurdles
Chris Finnegan — Boxing, Men's Middleweight
Derek Allhusen, Jane Bullen, Ben Jones, and Richard Meade — Equestrian, Three-Day Event Team Competition
Bob Braithwaite — Shooting, Men's Trap Shooting
Rodney Pattisson & Iain MacDonald-Smith — Sailing, Men's Flying Dutchman

Silver
Lillian Board — Athletics, Women's 400 metres
Sheila Sherwood — Athletics, Women's Long Jump
Derek Allhusen — Equestrian, Three-Day Event Individual Competition
Marion Coakes — Equestrian, Jumping Individual Competition
Martyn Woodroffe — Swimming, Men's 200m Butterfly

Bronze
John Sherwood — Athletics, Men's 400m Hurdles
David Broome — Equestrian, Jumping Individual Competition
Robin Aisher, Paul Anderson, and Adrian Jardine — Sailing, Men's 5½ Meter Class

Athletics

Men's Hammer Throw
Howard Payne
Qualifying Round — 68.06m
Final — 67.62m (→ 10th place)

Women's Pentathlon
 Sue Scott
 Final Result — 4.786 points (→ 10th place)

Boxing

Men's Heavyweight (+ 81 kg)
Billy Wells
 First Round — Lost to Ionas Chepulis (URS), TKO-3

Canoeing

Cycling

Fourteen cyclists represented Great Britain in 1968.

Individual road race
 Dave Rollinson
 Brian Jolly
 Billy Bilsland
 Les West

Team time trial
 John Bettison
 Roy Cromack
 Pete Smith
 John Watson

Sprint
 Reg Barnett
 Ian Alsop

1000m time trial
 Brendan McKeown

Individual pursuit
 Ian Hallam

Team pursuit
 Ian Alsop
 Harry Jackson
 Ian Hallam
 Ronald Keeble

Diving

Equestrian

Fencing

17 fencers, 12 men and 5 women, represented Great Britain in 1968.

Men's foil
 Graham Paul
 Bill Hoskyns
 Mike Breckin

Men's team foil
 Allan Jay, Graham Paul, Nick Halsted, Mike Breckin, Bill Hoskyns

Men's épée
 Ralph Johnson
 Nick Halsted
 Bill Hoskyns

Men's team épée
 Nick Halsted, Teddy Bourne, Bill Hoskyns, Ralph Johnson, Peter Jacobs

Men's sabre
 Rodney Craig
 Sandy Leckie
 Richard Oldcorn

Men's team sabre
 Sandy Leckie, Rodney Craig, David Acfield, Richard Oldcorn

Women's foil
 Janet Wardell-Yerburgh
 Sue Green
 Judith Bain

Women's team foil
 Judith Bain, Janet Wardell-Yerburgh, Sue Green, Julia Davis, Eva Davies

Gymnastics

Hockey

Modern pentathlon

Three male pentathletes represented Great Britain in 1968.

Individual
 Jim Fox
 Barry Lillywhite
 Robert Phelps

Team
 Jim Fox
 Barry Lillywhite
 Robert Phelps

Rowing

There were seven rowing events for men only and Great Britain entered two boats. In the coxed eight, Malcolm Malpass in seat 5 was replaced with John Mullard in the B final.

Sailing

Shooting

Ten shooters, all men, represented Great Britain in 1968. Bob Braithwaite won gold in the trap.

25 m pistol
 Tony Clark
 Robert Hassell

50 m pistol
 Charles Sexton
 Marcus Loader

50 m rifle, prone
 John Palin
 Alister Allan

Trap
 Bob Braithwaite
 Eric Grantham

Skeet
 Alec Bonnett
 Colin Sephton

Swimming

Weightlifting

Wrestling

References

Nations at the 1968 Summer Olympics
1968
Summer Olympics